Arse is a district in the South Tapanuli Regency, North Sumatra province of Sumatra, Indonesia. The district of Arse lies to the south of Saipar Dolok Hole.

The Arse district is divided into ten communities: Sipogu, Lancat, Natambang Roncitan, Nanggar Jati, Nanggar Jati Huta Padang, Aek Haminjon, Pardomuan, Dalihan Natolu, and the capital town Arse Nauli. As of the 2020 census, the population of Arse was 8,677. The population is mostly Muslim, with a small number of Protestant Christians.

References

External links

North Sumatra